Matthew Rosa (born 23 November 1986) is a former Australian rules footballer who played for the Gold Coast Football Club in the Australian Football League (AFL). Originally from Warracknabeal and later Ballarat, Victoria, Rosa played under-18 football for the North Ballarat Rebels in the TAC Cup before being drafted by the West Coast Eagles in the 2004 National Draft. He made his debut for the club in 2005 and was nominated for the AFL Rising Star the following season in 2006. He played 168 games for West Coast but at the end of the 2015 season, requested a trade to the Gold Coast Suns. Having played 207 games, Rosa hung up the boots at the end of the 2018 season. In October 2018 he has joined the West Coast Eagles coaching panel which he left at 2020 season's end.

Career

He is a midfielder who was recruited as the number 29 draft pick in the 2004 AFL Draft from the North Ballarat Rebels. Rosa made his debut for the West Coast Eagles in Round 17, 2005 against the Sydney Swans. He was selected for first two weeks of the 2006 finals, but then was dropped for the last two weeks of finals, being named as an emergency for the 2006 AFL Grand Final, which the Eagles won.

The 2007 season bought new opportunities for Rosa, who played 22 games for the home and away season and was selected in the squad to play in both the two games in the finals series. He suffered from shin splints in 2008, restricting him to just 8 games for the season. He returned in 2009 to play all 22 games.

Rosa played his 150th game in 2014 and re-signed with the club for two more years, however, in October 2015, he requested and later received a trade to the Gold Coast Suns.

In August 2018, Rosa announced his retirement from AFL football.

References

External links

1986 births
Australian rules footballers from Victoria (Australia)
Living people
Greater Western Victoria Rebels players
North Ballarat Football Club players
Peel Thunder Football Club players
West Coast Eagles players
People from Warracknabeal
Australian people of Italian descent
Gold Coast Football Club players
People educated at St Patrick's College, Ballarat